Derya Alabora (born Derya Harupçu, August 19, 1959) is a Turkish actress.

She was born in Istanbul. She graduated from the theater department at the conservatory of Mimar Sinan University in 1982. She has won two Golden Orange awards for her roles in Masumiyet and Yengeç Sepeti.

Filmography

Awards
 3rd Yeşilçam Awards (March 23, 2010) - Best Supporting Actress for Pandora's Box
 27th Fajr International Film Festival, "World Panorama" section  (February 3, 2009) - Best Performance for Pandora's Box, along with Tsilla Chelton and Ovul Avkiran

References 

 Digitalfilmacademy.com.tr - Biography of Derya Alabora

External links 

 

Actresses from Istanbul
Living people
Turkish film actresses
Best Supporting Actress Golden Orange Award winners
Best Actress Golden Orange Award winners
Best Actress Golden Boll Award winners
1959 births
Mimar Sinan Fine Arts University alumni
20th-century Turkish actresses
21st-century Turkish actresses